Mansfield Village may refer to:

Mansfield Center, Connecticut
Mansfield, Indiana